was a Japanese heavy machine gun, related to the Hotchkiss machine gun series. It entered service in 1932 and was the standard Japanese heavy machine gun used during World War II. Known for its reliability, it was used after the war by various forces in East Asia. Designed by Kijiro Nambu and built by Hino Motors and Hitachi, its total production was about 45,000 guns.

The Type 92 refers to the Japanese Imperial year 2592 – 1932 in the Gregorian calendar – in which the gun entered service.

Design
The Type 92 was essentially a scaled-up version of the Type 3 heavy machine gun, with its calibre increased to 7.7 mm, and like the Type 3 was air cooled, ammo strip-fed, and based on the Hotchkiss M1914. It could use both a rimless and semi-rimmed 7.7x58mm Shiki round. A 7.7mm Arisaka round could be used if necessary or if other ammunition supplies dwindled. It was sometimes used as a light anti-aircraft gun during the Pacific War. It was nicknamed "the woodpecker" by Western Allied soldiers because of the characteristic sound it made when fired due to its relatively low rate of fire, and the "chicken neck" by Chinese soldiers due to its appearance. The Type 92 had a maximum range of 4,500 meters, but a practical range of 800 meters.

The gun was intended to be fired on a tripod with a team of three men. The unusual tripod was designed with removable carry poles, so that the weapon could be transported fully assembled for quicker deployment.

An unusual characteristic of this gun was the placement of its iron sights – canted slightly to the right instead of centre. A number of different sights were produced for the weapon, the Type 93 and Type 94 periscopic sights as well as the Type 96 telescopic sight. A ring-type anti-aircraft sight was also produced.

Major problems with this weapon included the short feed strips, which did not allow for as high a volume of fire as a belt-fed gun, and the oiler, which enabled better extraction in clean conditions but could bring dirt inside the gun in the field. The gun has an internal oil pump which is mechanically activated by the bolt. The oil pump dispenses a small amount of oil onto a brush, which then lubricates each cartridge as it is fed into the gun.

Combat history 
The Type 92 was used extensively by the Imperial Japanese Army and collaborationist Chinese forces. Captured weapons were also used by Chinese National Revolutionary Army troops against the Japanese during World War II, the Korean People's Army against the United Nations forces during the Korean War, the Viet Minh against the CEFEO forces during the First Indochina War, and the Indonesian Army against the Netherlands forces during the Indonesian National Revolution.

Users
 
 
 
 : Used by the IJA and various collaborationist forces.
 
 : Used by police
: intended to replace the Type 3 heavy machine gun but not provided in sufficient numbers
 
 
  Viet Minh and Viet Cong

See also
Type 1 heavy machine gun

Gallery

References

External links

 US Army technical manual TM-E 30–480 at hyperwar
 

Heavy machine guns
Machine guns of Japan
World War II infantry weapons of Japan
World War II machine guns
Military equipment introduced in the 1930s